Leo Costa is a given name. It may refer to:

 Leo Costa (footballer, born 1984), Brazilian football striker
 Léo Costa (footballer, born 1986), Brazilian football attacking midfielder

See also
 Leonardo Costa (born 1977), Brazilian swimmer